FSB may refer to:

Organizations
 Federal Security Service ( (FSB), the principal security agency of the Russian Federation and main successor to the defunct Committee for State Security (KGB) of the Soviet Union

Banking and finance
 Federal savings bank, a class of bank in the United States
 Federation of Small Businesses, a British lobbying group
 Financial Services Board (South Africa), a financial regulatory authority
 Financial Stability Board, an international group of financial authorities
 First Somali Bank, a bank headquartered in Mogadishu, Somalia
 Swedbank, formerly FöreningsSparbanken, a retail banking group

Computing
 Fast syndrome-based hash, cryptographic hash functions
 Front-side bus, a computer communication interface

Schools
 Farmer School of Business, at Miami University in the U.S. state of Ohio
 Friends School of Baltimore, a Quaker institution in Baltimore
 Fuqua School of Business, at Duke University in the U.S. state of North Carolina

Other
 FSB (band), a Bulgarian band
 Bolivian Socialist Falange, a Bolivian political party
 Brinjal fruit and shoot borer (Leucinodes orbonalis), a moth species
 Fellow of the Society of Biology, U.K.
 Fire support base, a temporary military encampment 
 Fishbourne railway station, in England
 Fortune Small Business, a defunct magazine
 Trade Union Social Citizens List, a Danish political group